Paul F. Hendrix is a Professor in the Odum School of Ecology at the University of Georgia. He is widely considered an expert in the biology and ecology of earthworm invasions.

References 

Year of birth missing (living people)
Living people
University of Georgia faculty